The Zerasca is a breed of upland sheep from the province of Massa Carrara, in Tuscany in central Italy. It is raised almost exclusively in the comune of Zeri and the neighbouring comune of Pontremoli. In the years after the Second World War, systematic use was made of Massese rams with the aim of improving milk yield; the result was a reduction in resistance to disease and ability to forage on poor terrain, an increase in mammary defects, an increase in colour variability, but little improvement in milk yield. The Zerasca is one of the forty-two autochthonous local sheep breeds of limited distribution for which a herdbook is kept by the Associazione Nazionale della Pastorizia, the Italian national association of sheep-breeders.

In 2012 the total number for the breed was 951.

References

Sheep breeds originating in Italy
Ark of Taste foods